Kellie Wilson may refer to:
 Kellie Wilson (gymnast)
 Kellie Wilson (model)

See also
 Kelly Wilson (disambiguation)